Valley Regional Transit (abbreviated VRT) is a public agency which is the main provider of mass transit service in metropolitan Boise, Idaho.  Seventeen routes operate in Ada County with seven of these providing six-day-per-week service in Boise. An on-demand service is provided in Canyon County. Four intercounty commuter lines are also offered. Both a peak hour express route and an all-day limited-stop incarnation of the same route connect Nampa and Meridian. Service also connects Boise State University with the College of Western Idaho in Nampa in which a third express route directly links the two. A fourth express route only runs twice per day in each direction connecting Caldwell and Boise.

VRT also operates Boise GreenBike, the city's bicycle-sharing system that was launched in 2015.

Fares
VRT offers a contactless smart card and mobile app under the City Go brand as methods to pay for rides, and also accepts cash and preloaded stored-value cards. The City Go app can be used to purchase passes, while the card can store a reloadable balance and features fare capping.

As of May 2022, fares are as follows:

Local fares apply to all routes except for 42, 43, and 45. These intercounty routes require a universal fare. For students, seniors, and people with disabilities, the single ride, day pass, and 31-day passes are offered for half price.

Routes

Ada County

Routes within Ada County mainly originate from Main Street Station or nearby along Main Street, although some routes originate from the Boise Towne Square Mall.

Canyon County
As of October 5th, 2020, the three previously fixed-route Canyon County services were replaced by the on-demand route 150. During this pilot program, riders can either use a mobile app or call VRT to request a ride between any bus stops within the Canyon County service area.

Intercounty

Facilities

Main Street Station

Located underground beneath City Center Plaza in downtown Boise, Main Street Station serves as Boise's main transit center. The majority of services within the city arrive underground at the station, although some arrive above ground on Main Street. In addition to VRT buses, Boise State University shuttle buses also serve the station, as the university's computer science department occupies two floors of the City Center Plaza building. These free shuttle buses run in a loop between Main Street Station and the Boise State Transit Center.

History
In 1994, the Idaho Legislature passed a law that allows cities or counties to place the creation of regional public transportation authorities on the ballot to request voter approval. In November 1998, voters in Ada and Canyon Counties approved creating an RPTA for their respective counties. A few months later, in January 1999, The boards of directors of the Ada County and Canyon County RPTAs voted to merge the two organizations, creating the Treasure Valley Regional Transportation Authority. The organization went through a few more name changes, becoming VIATrans, short for Valley InterArea Transportation, and then ValleyRide in June 2002. In July of that year, ValleyRide took over operations of Boise Urban Stages, which had been the operator of bus service in the city of Boise since 1973. By 2003, ValleyRide also operated service in Garden City previously offered by Garden City Interline, and had agreements with Treasure Valley Transit and Commuters Bus for the operation of the intercounty routes. In November 2004, the organization was renamed to Valley Regional Transit, with the ValleyRide name being used to describe the services offered. On March 1, 2005, the agreements with Treasure Valley Transit and Commuters Bus for the intercounty routes expired, and VRT began using First Transit to provide service on intercounty routes as well as routes within Canyon County.

On April 15, 2015, VRT launched Boise Greenbike, the city's bicycle-sharing system. At the end of September 2020, VRT suspended the program, with plans to restart it in the spring of 2021 using electric-assist bikes.

Future Projects
In January 2020, Valley Regional Transit agreed to buy 12 battery electric buses from Proterra. The first of these are expected to go into service in 2021 on a new route in Meridian. This route, linking Kleiner Park with a business center at the intersection of Ten Mile Road and Franklin Road, would be VRT's first to serve the downtown Meridian area.

Longer-term plans include increasing frequency on its most used routes, upgrading its maintenance facility, improving bus stops, and introducing an integrated fare payment system. Additionally, depending on the success of the on-demand pilot in Canyon County, a similar program could be considered for Boise.

References

External links

Transit agencies in Idaho
Bus transportation in Idaho
Organizations based in Boise, Idaho
Transportation in Ada County, Idaho
Transportation in Canyon County, Idaho
Meridian, Idaho
Transit authorities with natural gas buses